Park Sang-myun (born January 27, 1968) is a South Korean actor. He is best known for his comic roles, notably in My Wife Is a Gangster (2001).

Career
Park Sang-myun graduated in 1987 with a Theater degree from Seoul Institute of the Arts. He made his acting debut in 1993 in a Korean staging of the musical Guys and Dolls. Park first broke into the film industry with minor roles such as "Ashtray" in the hit 1997 comedy No. 3, but his strong acting talent soon captured the attention of audiences and filmmakers. His first major success came in 2000 via the wrestling comedy The Foul King, followed by a memorable role in firefighting drama Libera Me. Park's TV sitcom Three Friends further cemented his popularity as a character actor, and he became a common sight on TV programs and advertisements as well as on film.

In late 2001, Park scored his biggest hit with the comedy My Wife Is a Gangster, which attracted over 5 million viewers nationwide. As the "straight man," he played a mild-mannered government clerk who doesn't realize that his wife is a fearsome gang boss. Hi! Dharma!, released a couple months later, also became a runaway hit with audiences for its comic showdown between gangsters and Buddhist monks.

The year 2002 was less kind, however, with comedies Can't Live Without Robbery and Baby Alone both bombing at the box-office, effectively ending Park's career as a leading actor. Since then, he returned to supporting roles, in television dramas such as Seoul 1945 (2006) and King of Baking, Kim Takgu (2010).

Aside from his prolific film and TV career, Park also appears in small-scale stage plays and musicals, notably How Are You, Sister? about a soldier and a nun who meet during the Korean War (in Kim Sang-jin's debut as a theatre director), and Really Really Like You, a 1970s-set nostalgic romance between an English teacher and a high school baseball coach (adapted from the same-titled 1977 film).

Filmography

Film

Television series

Web series

Variety show

Theater

Awards and nominations

References

External links
 
 
 

1968 births
Living people
South Korean male film actors
South Korean male television actors
South Korean male stage actors
South Korean male musical theatre actors
Seoul Institute of the Arts alumni
South Korean Buddhists